John Percival Lyle (July 14, 1878 – 1968) was a United Kingdom-born farmer, rancher, real estate agent and political figure in Saskatchewan. He represented Lloydminster in the Legislative Assembly of Saskatchewan from 1912 to 1917 as a Liberal.

He was born in Barnstable, Devonshire, the son of Samuel Lyle, was educated in England, and came to Canada in 1903. In 1905, he married Marie Lynch. Lyle was a lieutenant and quartermaster with the 22nd Saskatchewan Light Horse from 1908 to 1911. He settled in Lloydminster, Saskatchewan.

References 

Saskatchewan Liberal Party MLAs
1878 births
1968 deaths
British emigrants to Canada